St Mary de Pratis or St Mary de la Pré, meaning  St Mary of the Meadows or St Mary in the Meadow may refer to one of a number of former Abbeys or Priories established in England, primarily in the 12th century. Most of these establishments are located within The Midlands, England.

References

Christian monasteries established in the 12th century